Culpable de este Amor (Guilty of this Love) is an Argentine telenovela produced and broadcast by Telefe in 2004.

Cast 
 Agustín Rivero - Juan Darthés
 Laura Cazenave - Gianella Neyra
 Marcos Soler - Raúl Taibo
 Fernando Salazar - Mauricio Dayub
 Virginia Marvin - Gloria Carrá
 Román Machado - Rafael Ferro
 Julia Rodríguez de Soler - Silvia Kutika
 Pablo Casenave - Mariano Bertolini
 Víctor Musad - Ramiro Blas
 Lorena Villaalba - María Carámbula
 Soledad - Catalina Artusi
 Alejo (Nicolás García) - Darío Lopilato
 Vilma Zapata - Noemí Frenkel
 Diana Segovia - Magela Zanotta
 Gabriela Sánchez - Leonora Balcarce
 Gastón Rivero - José María Monje
 Clara Salcedo - Julieta Novarro
 Verónica Iglesias - Sabrina Garciarena
 Luciana - Manuela Pal
 Gustavo Ludueña - Marcelo Melingo
 Roberta Soldati - Lucrecia Capello
 Jimena - Bettina O'Connell
 Sandra Quiñones - Silvina Acosta
 Sarita - Loren Acuña
 Doctor Robledo - Eduardo Lemos
 Labarde - Sergio Bermejo
 Amalia Bruzzi - Malena Figo
 Miguel Bruzzi - Daniel Orlando García
 Néstor Gómez - Manuel Novoa
 Lucio Andrade - Patricio Pepe
 Celso Azor - Guido d'Albo
 Guillermo 'Willy' López - Maxi Zago
 Lic. Chávez - Jorge Alberto Gómez
 Doctor Polack - Carlos Rivkin
 Policial Morales - Daniel Campomenosi
 Pamela Díaz (Marcela Aguirre de Machado) - Verónica Ponieman
 Doctor Jiménez - Marcelo Breit
 Teodoro - Guillermo Marcos
 Greta - Beatriz Thiabaudin
 Herminia - Cristina Fridman
 Gladys - Paola Messina
 Martín Rizzo - Martín Borisenko
 Adrián Salazar - Pompeyo Audivert
 Lic. Aberasturi - Daniel Lemes
 Lic. Héctor Eduardo - Fernando Sureda
 Silvia Lagos - Rita Terranova
 Macedo - Daniel de Vita
 Bazán - Claudio Torres
 Esteban - Fabio Aste
 Andrés Ligero - Fabián Pizzorno
 Olga Zamudio - Mónica Villa
 Galloso - Pia Uribelarrea
 Sasha - Julieta Zylberberg
 Padre Arnaldo - Juan Carlos Puppo
 Padre Javier - Jorge Gómez
 Franco Galván - Adrián Navarro

References

External links 
 

2004 telenovelas
Argentine telenovelas
2004 Argentine television series debuts
2004 Argentine television series endings
Telefe telenovelas
Spanish-language telenovelas